Sara Annette Joyner (born 1967) is a United States Navy officer. She is the first female strike fighter pilot to command a United States Navy fighter squadron and a carrier air wing. Her promotion to rear admiral (lower half) was authorized by the United States Senate on 25 May 2017. On 24 February, the Secretary of Defence announced that Joyner would be promoted to the rank of rear admiral (upper half); she was pinned on 1 April 2021. She was promoted to vice admiral on 3 June 2022.

Early life and education
Sara Annette Applegarth was born on Hoopers Island in Maryland. She is one of four children of Samuel Hubert Applegarth Jr. and Sara Jane (McClaran) Applegarth. Her father, Commander Hubert Applegarth, retired from active duty in the United States Navy in 1977, having graduated from the United States Naval Academy in 1951. The family property in the village of Honga on Upper Hoopers Island was purchased by Sara's great-grandfather William Francis Applegarth Sr. in 1891. Her great-grandfather later served as a member of the Maryland House of Delegates and the Maryland Senate.

Applegarth also attended the United States Naval Academy. She graduated with a Bachelor of Science in Oceanography in 1989 and was commissioned as an ensign. She then attended flight school and earned her naval aviator wings in July 1991.

Career
Sara Joyner became a fighter pilot in 1996, flying an F/A-18 Hornet with VFA-147. She assumed command of Strike Fighter Squadron 105 from Commander Douglas C. Verissimo on 2 March 2007. She turned over command to Commander Thomas R. Tennant on 9 June 2008.

Joyner later became deputy commander of Carrier Air Wing Three, assuming full command from Captain Michael S. Wallace on 4 January 2013. The air wing embarked on a deployment aboard  on 22 July 2013. She commanded the air wing until relieved by Captain George Wikoff on 22 December 2013.

In June 2018, Joyner became Director for Manpower and Personnel, J1 for the Joint Chiefs of Staff. In August 2019, she assumed command of Carrier Strike Group 2. Joyner was succeeded by Rear Admiral  Richard J. Cheeseman at the end of April 2020. Joyner served as chief of legislative affairs for the Department of the Navy until May 2022.

In April 2022, Joyner was nominated for promotion to vice admiral and assignment as director for force structure, resources and assessment of the Joint Staff (J8). She was promoted on 3 June 2022.

Personal
Joyner is married to James Mitchell Joyner IV, her Naval Academy classmate and fellow naval aviator. They were married on 19 February 1992 in Cameron County, Texas, and have two children. Her husband Commander James Joyner retired from active duty in the navy in 2014.

References

External links

 Vice Admiral Sara Joyner, U.S. Navy Biography

1967 births
Living people
People from Dorchester County, Maryland
United States Naval Academy alumni
Women United States Naval Aviators
Aviators from Maryland
Recipients of the Air Medal
Recipients of the Legion of Merit
Female admirals of the United States Navy
Recipients of the Defense Superior Service Medal
21st-century American women